The Men's road race of the 2013 UCI Road World Championships was a cycling event that took take place on 29 September 2013 in the region of Tuscany, Italy.

As in previous years, the race was the final event of the Road World Championships. The race was won by Rui Costa who beat Joaquim Rodríguez in a sprint finish, with a total time of 7h 25min 44s, the second highest time in UCI Road World Championships history.

Route
The race started in Lucca and ended in the Nelson Mandela Forum in Florence. The final run-in of the race around Florence was also hilly, with the ride up to Fiesole and the via Bolognese in Florence being particularly steep. This run-in was similar to that of stage 9 of the 2013 Giro d'Italia.

National qualification
Qualification was based on performances on the UCI run tours during 2013. Results from January to the middle of August would count towards the qualification criteria on both the 2013 UCI World Tour and the UCI Continental Circuits across the world, with the rankings being determined upon the release of the numerous tour rankings on 15 August 2013.

Schedule

Source

Results

Final classification

Riders who failed to finish
147 riders failed to finish the race.

References

External links
 Men's road race: The route
 Men's road race: The riders

Men's road race
UCI Road World Championships – Men's road race
2013 in men's road cycling